PRSV may refer to:

 The plant pathogenic virus Papaya ringspot virus
 In thermodynamics, the Peng–Robinson–Stryjek–Vera equation of state